John Greenlees Semple (10 June 1904 in Belfast, Ireland – 23 October 1985 in London, England) was a British mathematician working in algebraic geometry.

Publications

Algebraic Projective Geometry. By J. G. Semple and G. T. Kneebone. Pp. viii, 404. 35s. 1952. (Oxford University Press).

References

20th-century British mathematicians
Scientists from Belfast
Mathematicians from Northern Ireland
1904 births
1985 deaths